Haplocyonopsis is an extinct genus of terrestrial carnivores belonging to the suborder Caniformia, family Amphicyonidae ("bear dog").

Lived in Miocene epoch in Europe.

Haplocyonopsis was named by de Bonis (1973) and was assigned to Amphicyonidae by Carroll (1988).

Sources

Haplocyonopsis - Position in a system | BioLib.cz
European Neogene Mammal Chronology
Global Names Index 

Bear dogs
Prehistoric carnivoran genera